Paraguayan Argentines are Argentine citizens of full or partial Paraguayan descent or Paraguay-born people who reside in Argentina. Paraguayan people comprise an important ethnic group in the country due to the sustained immigration that gained importance in the 1970s. The number of people born in Paraguay living in Argentina has been estimated in around 325,000. Therefore, it is the largest foreign community in the country outnumbering individuals from Italy and Spain (countries which have been historically regarded as the origin of the backbone of Argentine society). It is also one of the fastest growing foreign nationalities. Despite all this, its numbers have been undercounted so it is believed that the real amount is even much higher.

History 

The North-Eastern provinces of Argentina were originally inhabited by Guarani tribes conforming with what is now Paraguay and several regions of Brazil the area of influence of Guarani culture. This influence can be seen nowadays in many common cultural features. However, the earliest presence of Paraguayans as an ethnic group can be traced back much later, to the second foundation (and the real permanent settlement) of the city of Buenos Aires by Juan de Garay who sailed down Parana River from Asuncion accompanied by local Mestizo and Guarani families. In addition, there have always been certain connections between the two countries during later periods of the Spanish rule, especially when the Viceroyalty of the Rio de la Plata was created in 1776 which included several Intendencias, among them the Intendencia of Paraguay and Intendencia of Buenos Aires.

There has been Paraguayan presence in Argentine soil during and after the Paraguayan War and after the Revolution of 1947 in Paraguay but it did not acquire importance before 1970. For many economic reasons (Paraguay being an impoverished country) and political reasons (Stroessner dictatorship), Paraguayans started to settle in larger amounts throughout the wealthier neighbouring territory. Another fact was the porosity of Argentine borders and that the population density has always been disproportionally higher in the Eastern region (Argentine-Brazilian border) rather than the Western region or Chaco (Bolivian border).

Very different from other immigrant communities in Argentina (European and Middle-Eastern), Paraguayan entrance has been large (with insignificant return rate) and constant even to these days which makes up to 40 years of sustained immigration that does not seem to stop or decline in the future.

Distribution 

In addition, due to geographical proximity facilitating movement and cultural exchange, 40% of the Paraguayan-born community is settled in provinces of the Northeastern region of Argentina, namely Misiones, Corrientes, Formosa, Santa Fe, Córdoba and Chaco, which are near the Argentina–Paraguay border. The 10% left is spread throughout the rest of the provinces.

Traditions 

Some cultural elements shared by Argentina and Paraguay include the consumption of Yerba Mate (Ilex paraguayensis) in the form of mate, a traditional infused drink with hot water claimed by Argentina, Paraguay and Uruguay as the national drink, as well as Tereré, a traditional infused drink with cold water and Mate cocido, a traditional infused drink with hot water, both originally from Paraguay; Chamame, folk music genre with its origins in Guarani Jesuit Missions mixed with European styles, and the use of the Guaraní Language, which is the official language of Paraguay and second official language of the Argentine Corrientes Province since 24 September 2004.

Guarani placenames in Argentina

Corrientes 
Ituzaingó
Curuzú Cuatiá
Caá Catí
Cerro Corá
Mburucuyá ("Passion flower" the National flower of Paraguay)
Mocoretá
Tabay ("small town")
Tapebicua
Tatacuá ("the hole of the fire")
Taragui
Yahapé
Yataytí Calle
Yapeyú
Itatí
Itá Ibaté ("tall stone")
Guaviraví
Vaca Cuá 
Ita Corá
Aguay

Misiones 
Oberá ("shiny")
Caa Yarí
Capiobí
Caraguatay
Garuhapé
Garuhapé-Mi
Garupá
Guaraní
Itacaruaré
Mbopicuá ("hole of the bat")
Panambí ("butterfly")
Pindapoy
Piray Kilómetro 18
Puerto Iguazú (Iguazú meaning "large water")
Puerto Piray (Piray meaning "small fish")
Tarumá
Tacuaruzú
Cuña-Pirú

Chaco 
Samuhú ("Chorisia" a kind of subtropical tree)
Colonia Tacuarí
El Paranacito

Salta 
Aguaray
Yariguarenda
Yacuy
El Aguay
Acambuco
Itangua
Tobantirenda
Capiazuti

Santa Fe 
Tacuarendí ("sugarcane fields") 
El Arazá
Caraguatay
Aguará Grande
Ñanducita ("small spider")
Tacural ("anthills")
Vera ("shiny")
Carcarañá ("mean caracara")

Santiago del Estero 
Añatuya
Caburé
Urutaú

Tucumán 
Tukumã
Tapia ("wall")
El Timbo

Formosa 
Pirané ("smelly fish")
Ibarreta
Yatai
Tatané

Entre Ríos 
Gualeguay
Paraná
Mandisoví
Villaguay
Ubajay
Gualeguaychú
Chajarí
Ñancay
Ibicuy

Buenos Aires Province 
Pehuajó, Reta "retã" ("country or nation"), Mar de Ajó, Mar del Tuyú, San Bernardo del Tuyú,  Ituzaingó ("waterfall")

Rivers 
Paraná
Paraguay ("colorful water")
Uruguay ("water of the birds")
Carapari
Gualeguay
Gualeguaychú
Guayquiraró
Rivers of the Paraná Delta Ibicuy

Notable Paraguayan Argentines

Politicians

 Aníbal Ibarra (born 1958), former mayor of Buenos Aires
 Vilma Ibarra (born 1960), former congresswoman

Arts and culture

 Arnaldo André (born 1943), actor
 Julio Bazan (born 1946), journalist
 Gabriel Casaccia (1907–1980), novelist 
 Florencia de la V (born 1975), television presenter and vedette
 Mariana Enríquez (born 1973), novelist and short story writer
 Eloy Fariña Núñez (1885–1929), writer
 Pablo Lescano (born 1977), cumbia villera musician
 Ángel Menchaca (1855–1924), music theorist and composer
 Nelly Prono (1926–1997), actress

Sportspeople

 Roberto Acuña (born 1972), footballer
 Lucas Barrios (born 1984), footballer
 Raúl Bobadilla (born 1987), footballer
 Juan José Cáceres (born 2000), footballer
 Marcelo Cañete (born 1990), footballer
 Darío Espínola (born 1973), footballer
 Luis Fariña (born 1991), footballer
 Nicole Hain (born 2000), futsal player
 Juan Iturbe (born 1993), footballer
 Hilario Navarro (born 1980), footballer
 Leandro Paredes (born 1994), footballer and 2022 World Cup champion for Argentina
 Jonathan Santana (born 1981), footballer

See also 

 Immigration to Argentina
 Argentina–Paraguay relations
 Argentine Paraguayans

References

External links 

Immigration to Argentina
Ethnic groups in Argentina
 
Argentina